Targui is a board game published in 1988 by Jumbo Games.

Contents
Targui is a game in which the board us made up by laying tiles representing various types of terrain onto a blank board, and each player starts a settlement in a corner of the board.

Reception
Brian Walker reviewed Targui for Games International magazine, and gave it 4 stars out of 5, and stated that "recommended is the 12 turn option game length which would take about two hours to complete. The full 16 turns is too much for the game to handle, especially if there has been an elimination and you've got a paranoiac wailing away in the background. You know how these people can be."

Reviews
Jeux & Stratégie #51

References

Board games introduced in 1988
Jumbo Games games